The Long Pines,  elevation , is a small mountain range southeast of Ekalaka, Montana, in Carter County.

This range is closely affiliated with three other small ranges in the area:  the Ekalaka Hills, which are also located in Carter County, the East Short Pine Hills, which are located southwest of Buffalo, South Dakota, and the West Short Pine Hills, which are located south of Camp Crook, South Dakota.

Long Pines is the current designation of the former Long Pine National Forest, which was eventually consolidated into the Custer Gallatin National Forest.  The majority of this land unit’s current  lies within Carter County, Montana;  of that total extend east into Harding County, South Dakota.

The Long Pines land unit is part of Custer Gallatin’s Sioux Ranger District, as are the aforementioned Ekalaka Hills, East Short Pine Hills, and West Short Pine Hills land units.

See also
 List of mountain ranges in Montana

References

Mountain ranges of Montana
Landforms of Carter County, Montana